Valensi is a surname of Jewish origin. Notable people with the surname include:

 Georges Valensi (1889–1980), French telecommunications engineer
 Lucette Valensi (born 1936), French historian
 Nick Valensi (born 1981), American musician and songwriter

Jewish surnames